Roger d'Abetot (sometimes Roger of Abitôt) was a medieval English Sheriff of Worcestershire.

Roger was the son of Urse d'Abetot, his predecessor as sheriff. He also held the custody of Worcester Castle, another office he inherited from his father. He may also have been a constable in Henry I's household, as his father had been. Along with the offices, Roger also inherited the feudal barony of Salwarpe in Worcestershire. He was banished from England in around 1110 or in 1114 by King Henry I, and lost his office because of this. His lands were also forfeit. According to the medieval writer William of Malmesbury, Henry exiled him because Roger ordered that a royal official be killed.

The office passed to Osbert d'Abetot, who may have been Roger's uncle, before eventually ending up with Roger's brother-in-law Walter de Beauchamp.

Citations

Sources

 
 
 
 
  
 

Normans in England
High Sheriffs of Worcestershire